Andrew Smith (born 10 February 1961) is an American-born British journalist and nonfiction writer. He lives in New York.

Career
Smith is the author of Totally Wired: on the Trail of the Great Dotcom Swindle, which tells the story of Josh Harris's role in the birth of the World Wide Web and subsequent dotcom bubble in New York at the end of the 1990s.

Smith also wrote Moondust: In Search of the Men Who Fell to Earth, in which he travels across America in search of the nine surviving U.S. astronauts who walked on the moon between 1969 and 1972.

His next book Adventures in Coderland, is currently "in the works".

Smith has made two documentaries for BBC Four. The first, Being Neil Armstrong, is a trip across America to explore the personal history of the first person on the moon. The second, To Kill a Mockingbird at 50, about how Monroeville, Alabama has changed since it was used by Harper Lee as the setting for her novel.

References

External links
 
Review by the National Book Review.  Retrieved on 2006-08-24.
Business Week review. Retrieved on 2006-08-24.

British non-fiction writers
1961 births
Living people
British male writers
Male non-fiction writers